Ilısu  (Avurga) is a  village in Gülnar district of Mersin Province, Turkey. The population of the village was 250 in 2012.

Avurga was founded in 1850 as a hamlet of the nearby village Ilısu. But after a landslide in the main village in 1981, Ilısu residents also moved to Avurga and the village was renamed Ilısu.

References

Villages in Gülnar District